Pollex kononenkoi is a moth of the family Erebidae first described by Michael Fibiger in 2007. It is known from northern Sulawesi in Indonesia.

The wingspan is about 10 mm. The forewing is narrow and light brown, but dark brown on both sides of the terminal line. The hindwing is unicolorous brown with an indistinct black discal spot and the underside unicolorous brown.

References

Micronoctuini
Taxa named by Michael Fibiger
Moths described in 2007